The Adelaide Pre-Release Centre is a minimum security Australian prison in the Adelaide suburb of Northfield. It is the main pre-release facility in South Australia for both male and female prisoners.

It has a capacity of 104 prisoners.

References

External links
Adelaide Pre-Release Centre

Prisons in Adelaide